The Serious Fraud Office may refer to:

 Serious Fraud Office (United Kingdom)
 Serious Fraud Office (New Zealand)
 Serious Fraud Investigation Office, India